Gilberto Echeverri Mejía (31 July 1936 – 5 May 2003) was a Colombian electrical engineer, businessman and politician who on 21 April 2002 was kidnapped by the Revolutionary Armed Forces of Colombia - FARC-EP along with the then-Governor of Antioquia Guillermo Gaviria Correa among others while participating in a peace walk and held hostage until 5 May 2003 when he was murdered by the guerrillas during a botched rescue operation by government forces deep in the Colombian northwestern jungle, bordering between Antioquia and Chocó. A Liberal party politician, he had previously served as Ambassador of Colombia to Ecuador from 1975 to 1977 in the Administration of President Alfonso López Michelsen, Minister of Economic Development from 1978 to 1980 in the Administration of President Julio César Turbay Ayala, Minister of National Defence from 1997 to 1998 in the Administration of President Ernesto Samper Pizano, and was working as peace advisor to Governor Gaviria before he was kidnapped.

Personal life
Gilberto was born on 31 July 1936 in Rionegro, Antioquia and was the youngest of twelve children born to José María Echeverri and María Mejía. He finished his secondary education in 1954 at the Pontifical Bolivarian University where he also graduated in 1959 with a Bachelor of Electrical Engineering. In 1962 he married Marta Inés Pérez Mejía, with whom he had three children: Lina María, Jorge Ignacio, and Carlos Arturo.

Works selected

See also
 Colombian conflict
 Consuelo Araújo
 List of kidnappings

References

1936 births
2003 deaths
Ambassadors of Colombia to Ecuador
Assassinated Colombian politicians
Colombian electrical engineers
Colombian Liberal Party politicians
Colombian Ministers of Defense
Colombian Ministers of Economic Development
Governors of Antioquia Department
Kidnapped Colombian people
Kidnapped politicians
Male murder victims
People from Antioquia Department
Pontifical Bolivarian University alumni